The 1999 Cincinnati Bearcats football team represented the University of Cincinnati in the 1999 NCAA Division I-A football season. The team, coached by Rick Minter, played their home games in Nippert Stadium, as it has since 1924.

Schedule

Roster

References

External links
1999 Cincinnati - Wisconsin Football Game
Cincinnati Coach's show for 1999 Cincinnati - Wisconsin Football Game

Cincinnati
Cincinnati Bearcats football seasons
Cincinnati Bearcats football